Poovalur  is a village in the Avadaiyarkoilrevenue block of Pudukkottai district, Tamil Nadu, India.

Demographics
As per the 2001 census, Poovalur had a total population of 384 with 178 males and 206 females. Out of the total population 233 people were literate.

References

Villages in Pudukkottai district